Builders FirstSource, Inc. is a Fortune 500 company that is a manufacturer and supplier of building materials. The company is headquartered in Dallas, Texas, and is the largest supplier of building products, prefabricated components and value-added services in the US. Builders FirstSource employs over 15,000 people throughout the USA.  They serve new residential construction, repair and remodeling professionals. The company was incorporated in March 1998. The company has about 550 locations in 40 US states.

In 2015, Builders FirstSource acquired ProBuild.  This acquisition resulted in a combined entity with $6.1 billion in combined 2014 revenue. In 2018, the revenue of the combined company was $7.7 Billion.

In December 2019, Builders FirstSource acquired Raney Components, LLC and Raney Construction, Inc, located in Groveland, Florida.

In January 2020, Builders FirstSource acquired Bianchi & Company, Inc, a millwork supplier and install company located in Charlotte, North Carolina. In September 2020, Builders FirstSource announced a merger with BMC Stock Holdings, in which the newly merged company would operate under the Builders FirstSource branding.

In August 2020, Builders FirstSource announced a merger with BMC Stock Holdings. This all stock merger transaction resulted in a combined company with $11 billion in sales and approximately 26,000 employees across 42 states.  The surviving entity retained the Builders FirstSource name.

In January 2021, the company announced that former BMC president and CEO Dave Flitman was named president. Flitman was later named CEO of the company in April 2021 after a 90-day transition.

Builders FirstSource announced authorization of a new $1 billion stock repurchase plan on February 18, 2022. This announcement comes on the heels of the completion of $2 Billion stock repurchase programs initiated in 2021. As of February 17, 2022, shares outstanding were approximately 176.8 million shares. Builders FirstSource will use its discretion to determine the timing and amount of any share repurchases under the new plan. Builders FirstSource is not required to repurchase any particular amount of its common stock, and the share repurchase program may be suspended or discontinued at any time at the company's discretion.

References

External links

Companies based in Dallas
Companies listed on the New York Stock Exchange
Companies formerly listed on the Nasdaq
Business services companies established in 1998
Building materials companies of the United States